CJSC Aviastar-SP is a Russian aircraft factory based in Ulyanovsk and founded in 1976. It is a closed shares joint stock company. It replaced the Soviet Ulyanovsk Aviation Industrial Complex and manufactures the cargo aircraft An-124 Ruslan, Il-76 and the whole Tu-204 family (except Tu-214).

History
Designed from scratch in the early 1970s to produce a new generation of strategic bombers, the Ulyanovsk Aviation Production Complex (renamed Aviastar in November 1991 when it became a joint stock enterprise) is said to be the largest aviation production facility in the world and one of the newest in Russia.

It produces the An-124 long-range heavy transport aircraft and the 200-seat Tu-204 medium-range airliner. Ulyanovsk was originally intended to have airframe, avionics, and engine manufacturing facilities all in one complex, but the avionics and engine facilities have not been completed.

The plant also owns 40,000 acres of arable land on which it produced agricultural goods for its workers and for sale in the early 1990s. In 2007, 1.25% of Aviastar-SP capital has been injected  into United Aircraft Corporation by the Russian Federation.

References

External links

 Official Aviastar Website

Aircraft manufacturers of the Soviet Union
Companies based in Ulyanovsk
Manufacturing companies established in 1992
United Aircraft Corporation